(1737–1800), also known as , was a Japanese politician  during late 18th-century Nagasaki bugyō or governor of Nagasaki port, located on southwestern shore of Kyūshū island in the Japanese archipelago.  Kuze was one of the Nagasaki bugyō between 1775 and 1784. His childhood name was Shōkurō (称九郎). His only daughter married Uesugi Yoshinaga.

As Nagasaki bugyō, Kuze was paired with another shogunate official, each alternately exchanging places in Edo and Nagasaki.  For example, the diaries maintained by Dutch East Indies Company (VOC) merchants during this period record that as Tsuchiya Morinao (Tsuchiya Suruga-no-kami) is arriving in Nagasaki  to take up his duties as Nagasaki bugyō on September 27, 1783, Kuze is preparing to leave en route to Edo; and they both will swap locations the following autumn.  The VOC accounts describe Kuze as a good governor.

Kuze is a close relation of one of the Osaka shoshidai in this period, Kuze Hiroakira.

In 1783, Kuze was also one of four Shogunal finance administrators or kanjō-bugyō (勘定奉行), along with Akai Tadamasa, Kurihara Morisada, and Matsumoto Hidemochi.  Tanuma Okitsugu was Kuze's patron. 
 
The oldest surviving letter from Kutsuki Masatsuna to Isaac Titsingh dates from 1789; and this letter mentions prominent mutual friends such as Kuze and Shimazu Shigehide, who was the father-in-law of the eleventh Tokugawa shōgun Ienari.

References

Further reading
 Lequin, Frank, ed. (1990).  The Private Correspondence of Isaac Titsingh, [Japonica neerlandica, IV] Amsterdam: J. C. Gieben.  
 Screech, Timon. (2005).  Japan Extolled: Japan Extolled and Decried: Carl Peter Thunberg and the Shogun's Realm, 1775–1796. London: RoutledgeCurzon.   (cloth)
 __. (2006). Secret Memoirs of the Shoguns:  Isaac Titsingh and Japan, 1779–1822. London: RoutledgeCurzon. 
 Toyama, Mikio. (1988). Nagasaki bugyō: edo bakufu no mimi to me (Chuko shinsho). Tokyo: Chūō Kōronsha.

See also
 Bugyō
 Machi-bugyō
 Historiographical Institute of the University of Tokyo

1737 births
1800 deaths
Hatamoto
Kuze clan
Officials of the Tokugawa shogunate